The 1985 USFL season was the third and final season of the United States Football League (USFL), and the last by a league using that name until the 2022 USFL season.

Rule changes
Adopted instant replay for the 1985 season. Under the instant-replay rule, a team may have one appeal per half in three situations:
A fumble or no-fumble situation.
Whether a pass is complete, incomplete or intercepted.
Whether the ball has penetrated the goal line.
The team asking for the replay would lose a time out if they were wrong.
The replay was available only in games televised by ABC.

Franchise changes
Pittsburgh Maulers fold.
Chicago Blitz suspend operations.
Michigan Panthers merge with the Oakland Invaders. 
Arizona Wranglers and the Oklahoma Outlaws merge and create the Arizona Outlaws.
New Orleans Breakers relocate to Portland, Oregon as the Portland Breakers.
Philadelphia Stars move games to College Park, Maryland, with plans to move to Baltimore in 1986, team is renamed the Baltimore Stars.
Washington Federals are sold and relocate to Orlando, Florida, as the Orlando Renegades.

General news
August 22, 1984, the owners voted to move to a fall schedule starting in 1986.

Harry Usher became the new commissioner of the USFL in January 1985.

The USFL and the United States Football League Players Association (USFLPA) agreed on a four-year agreement in March 1985. 

On April 29, 1985, the league's owners voted 13–2 to reaffirm their decision to begin playing a fall season in 1986.

Regular season
W = Wins, L = Losses, T = Ties, PCT= Winning Percentage, PF= Points For, PA = Points Against

 = Division Champion,  = Wild Card

New Jersey finished ahead of Memphis based on a head-to-head tiebreaker advantage (2-0-0).

Playoffs
Home team in CAPITALS

Quarterfinals June 29–30 and July 1
BIRMINGHAM 22, Houston 20
MEMPHIS 48, Denver 7
OAKLAND 30, Tampa Bay 27
Baltimore 20, NEW JERSEY 17

Semifinals July 6–7
Baltimore 28, BIRMINGHAM 14
Oakland 28, MEMPHIS 19

USFL Championship game July 14 (in East Rutherford, New Jersey)
Baltimore 28, OAKLAND 24

Statistics

1985 regular season stat leaders

1985 USFL regular season sortable offensive team statistics

1985 USFL regular season sortable defensive team statistics

Awards

WR Richard Johnson, HOU
WR Jim Smith, BIRM
TE Marvin Harvey, TB
T Irv Eatman, BAL
T Ray Pinney, OAKL
G Buddy Aydelette, BIRM
G Pat Saindon, BIRM
C Kent Hull, NJ
QB Jim Kelly, HOU
HB Herschel Walker, NJ
HB Gary Anderson, TB
DE James Lockette, NJ
DE Bruce Thornton, DENV
DT Reggie White, MEM
DT Dave Tipton, AZ
LB Sam Mills, BAL
LB Kiki DeAyala, HOU
CB Kerry Justin, NJ
CB David Martin, DENV/AZ
S Chuck Clanton, BIRM
S Mike Lush, BAL
K Brian Franco, JACK
KR Clarence Verdin, HOU
P Stan Talley, OAKL
PR Gerald McNeil, HOU
MVP – HB Herschel Walker, NJ
Coach of the year – Rollie Dotsch, BIRM
Special Teams Player of the year – WR Clarence Verdin, HOU

WR Richard Johnson, HOU
WR Jim Smith, BIRM
WR Anthony Carter,  OAKL
TE Gordon Hudson, LA
T Irv Eatman BAL
T Gary Zimmerman, LA
G Buddy Aydelette, BIRM
G Pat Saindon, BIRM
C Kent Hull, NJ
QB Jim Kelly, HOU
HB Herschel Walker, NJ
HB Gary Anderson, TB
DE Reggie White, MEM
DE William Fuller, BAL
DT Jearld Baylis, PORT
DT Doug Smith,  BIRM
OLB Herb Spencer, BIRM
OLB Andy Hawkins, HOU
ILB Sam Mills, BAL
ILB John Nevens, DENV
ILB Howard Carson, LA
CB Jerry Holmes, NJ
CB David Martin, DENV/AZ
S Barney Bussey, MEM
S Chuck Clanton, BIRM
K Tony Zendejas, LA
KR Clarence Verdin, HOU
P Stan Talley, OAKL
PR Gerald McNeil, HOU
Player of the year—HB Herschel Walker, NJ
Coach of the year -- Rollie Dotsch, BIRM
Executive of the year -- Jerry Sklar, BIRM

See also
 1985 NFL season

References

United States Football League
1985